James Pinckney Scales was a lawyer and state legislator in Mississippi. He served in the Mississippi House of Representatives including as Speaker of the House. He was from a prominent family. He was a Confederate officer during the American Civil War.

He was born in South Carolina. He graduated from the University of North Carolina in 1849. He served during the American Civil War.

He became Speaker at age 31. He wrote to governor John J. Pettus. He represented Carroll County, Mississippi.

References

This draft is in progress as of October 18, 2022.

Members of the Mississippi House of Representatives

Year of birth missing (living people)
Living people
Speakers of the Mississippi House of Representatives
University of North Carolina alumni
People from Carroll County, Mississippi
People of Mississippi in the American Civil War